Celestino Piaggio (20 December 1886 - 26 October 1931) was an Argentine pianist, conductor and composer. 

Piaggio was born in Concordia, Argentina. He studied at the Schola Cantorum, Paris. He died in Buenos Aires, aged 44.

Works, editions, recordings
Minuetto en mi bemol for piano, 1901
Los días, 7 miniaturas for piano, 1902
Miniatura for string orchestra, 1903
Hoja de álbum for violin and string orchestra, 1903
Andantino for string orchestra, 1904
Gavotta for string orchestra, 1904
Miniatura for piano, 1904
Página gris for piano, 1904
Bagatela for piano, 1904
Humorística for piano, 1904
Arabescos for piano, 1905
La urna, canzona, text by Alberto Williams, 1905
Yo no lo sé, song 1905
Danza for string orchestra, 1905
Madrigal for voice and piano, 1905
Trois mélodies texts by Tristan Klingsor, Jacques Normand and Sully Prudhomme, 1907
Taisons-nous, chanson, 1907
Les marionnettes, chanson, text by Tristán Klingsor, 1908
Chanson des belles, text by Tristán Klingsor, 1911
Sonata en do sostenido menor for piano, 1912–13
Obertura en do menor for orchestra, 1913–14
Sinfonía, 1915
Tonada for piano, 1915
Trois mélodies texts by André Suarès, 1915–17
Lourde, lourde était mon âme, chanson, text by André Suarés, 1916
Stella matutina, canzona, text by André Suarés, 1918
Homenaje a Julián Aguirre for piano, 1925

References

Argentine composers
1886 births
1931 deaths
People from Concordia, Entre Ríos